Economics Research Southern Africa (ERSA) is a research program funded by the National Treasury of South Africa.

The primary objectives of this research programme are:

 To provide for the management of a research programme focussed on growth, employment and broadening participation in the South African economy
 To create a network of economic researchers based in South African universities and to deepen economic research capacity in Southern Africa
 To expand and broaden economic research capacity in Southern Africa, train and mentor young economists and create a supportive network to link Southern African economic researchers.
 To draw a broad and representative range of South African economists into a programme of policy-oriented research, and to encourage independent and expert economic research.

See also
Economic Society of South Africa
Investment Analysts Society of Southern Africa
Economic History Society of Southern Africa

References

External links
ERSA homepage

Economy of South Africa
Research institutes in South Africa
Economic research institutes